Mahmoud Afshardoust (born 22 March 1975 in Karaj) is the secretary general of the Iranian Volleyball Federation, a former player and coach of the Iran men's national volleyball team. Afshardoust was invited to the national youth team of Iran in 1991, and in 1993 and 1994 he was the captain of the national youth team. In 1994, he became the most valuable (MVP) youth player in Asia. He was invited to the senior national team in 1995, and was in the senior national team until September 2003, won a silver medal in the 2002 Asian Games, and a bronze medal in the 2003 Asian Championship (China). Afshardoust was the coach of the Iranian national team from 2008 to 2010. He won a silver medal at the 2010 Asian Games in Guangzhou, and a silver medal at the 2009 Asian Championships in the Philippines. He was introduced as the Secretary General of the Volleyball Federation of Iran, and resigned from this position in April 2016.

Afshardoust was appointed as the director of the Kish Free Zone Organization's Institute of Healthy Sports and Recreation on April 12, 1997.

Afshardoust is a graduate of Kharazmi University, with a PhD in Sports Management, and has translated and authored several scientific and research articles, as well as five books on volleyball and fitness.

Afshardoust has been a lecturer at Kharazmi University and the Islamic Azad University, Karaj Branch.

Achievements 

 Secretary General of the Volleyball Federation of Iran (2012-2018)
 Expert and member of the board of directors of the Volleyball Federation of Iran by order of the Minister of Sports and Youth
 Member of the technical committee of the Volleyball Federation of Iran
 Managing Director of Kish Healthy Sports and Recreation Institute
 Member of the Coach Committee of the Asian Volleyball Confederation AVC
 Technical director of Iran's national adult volleyball team at the 2014 Incheon Asian Games and the 2016 Rio Olympics
 President of the Volleyball Association of the University Sports Federation
 Executive Director of International Tournament hosted by Iran (World League - Asian Championship)
 Holds the highest international coaching qualification (level 3) from the FIVB World Volleyball Federation
 Member of the think tank of the Volleyball Federation of Iran
 Instructor of Iran Volleyball Federation
 Member of Alborz Sports Strategic Council
 Senior Advisor to the executive board of the Sports and Healthy Recreation Committee of the Assembly of Mayors of Iranian Metropolises
 Head of Iran's national team B in the championship of Islamic countries. Indonesia
 Member of the Control and Organizing Committee of the World Student Olympics selected by the World Federation. Chinese Taipei 1396

Professional career

As player

National 

 Asian Games
  Silver: Busan, South Korea, 2002
 Asian Championship
  Bronze: Tianjin, China, 2003

Club 

 Asian Club Championship
 1996:  with Paykan Tehran
 1997:  with Paykan Tehran
 1999:  with Paykan Tehran
 2000:  with Paykan Tehran
 2002:  with Paykan Tehran
 2004:  with Paykan Tehran

As Coach

National 

 Asian Volleyball Cup (AVC)
  Gold: Urmia, Iran, 2010
 Asian Games
  Gold: Incheon, South Korea, 2014 (As Technical director)
  Silver: Guangzhou, China, 2010
 Asian Championship
  Silver: Manila, Philippines, 2009

References

External links 
 

People from Karaj
1975 births
Iranian volleyball coaches
Iranian men's volleyball players
Living people